Eochu Airem ("the ploughman"), son of Finn, was, according to medieval Irish legend and historical tradition, a High King of Ireland. He succeeded to the throne after the death of his brother, Eochu Feidlech, and ruled for twelve or fifteen years, until he was burned to death in Fremain by Sigmall Sithienta. He was succeeded by Eterscél. The Lebor Gabála synchronises his reign with the dictatorship of Julius Caesar (48–44 BC). The chronology of Geoffrey Keating's Foras Feasa ar Éirinn dates his reign to 82–70 BC, that of the Annals of the Four Masters to 131–116 BC.

He plays an important role in the Old Irish saga Tochmarc Étaíne ("The Wooing of Étaín"), which tells of the lives of the beautiful Étaín, the lover of Midir of the Tuatha Dé Danann, who was turned into a fly by Midir's jealous wife, which had been swallowed by the wife of Étar, an Ulster warrior. Étar's wife becomes pregnant, and Étaín is reborn. When Eochu invites the men of Ireland to the festival of Tara, they refuse to attend for a king who has no queen. He sends messengers to look for the most beautiful woman in Ireland, and they find Étaín. Eochu falls in love with her at first sight, and marries her.

However, Eochu's brother, Ailill Angubae, also falls in love with her, and wastes away with unrequited desire. Eochu leaves Tara on a tour of Ireland, leaving Étaín with the dying Ailill, who tells her the cause of his sickness, which he says would be cured if she gave the word. She tells him she wants him to be well, and he begins to get better, but says the cure will only be complete if she agrees to meet him on the hill above the house, so as not to shame the king in his own house. She agrees to do so three times, but each time she goes to meet him, she in fact meets Midir, who has put Ailill to sleep and taken his appearance. On the third occasion Midir reveals his identity and tells Étaín who she really is, but she does not know him. She finally agrees to go with him, but only if Eochu agrees to let her go.

Later, after Ailill has fully recovered and Eochu has returned home, Midir comes to Tara and challenges Eochu to play fidchell, an ancient Irish board game, with him. They play for ever increasing stakes. Eochu keeps winning, and Midir has to pay up. One such game compels Midir to build a causeway across the bog of Móin Lámrige: the Corlea Trackway, a wooden causeway built across a bog in County Longford, dated by dendrochronology to 148 BC, is a real-life counterpart to this legendary road. Finally, Midir suggests they play for a kiss and an embrace from Étaín, and this time he wins. Eochu tells Midir to come back in a month for his winnings, and gathers his best warriors at Tara to prepare for his return. Despite the heavy guard, Midir appears inside the house. Eochu agrees that Midir may embrace Étaín, but when he does, the pair fly away through the skylight, turning into swans as they do so.

Eochu instructs his men to dig up every síd (fairy-mound) in Ireland until his wife is returned to him. Finally, when they set to digging at Midir's síd at Brí Léith, Midir appears and promises to give Étaín back. But at the appointed time, Midir brings fifty women, who all look alike, and tells Eochu to pick which one is Étaín. He chooses the woman he thinks is his wife, takes her home and sleeps with her. She becomes pregnant and bears him a daughter. Later, Midir appears and tells him that Étaín had been pregnant when he took her, and the woman Eochu had chosen was his own daughter, who had been born in Midir's síd. Out of shame, Eochu, orders the daughter of their incestuous union to be exposed, but she is found and brought up by a herdsman and his wife, and later marries Eochu's successor Eterscél and becomes the mother of the High King Conaire Mór (in Togail Bruidne Dá Derga she is named as Mess Búachalla and is the daughter of Étaín and Eochu Feidlech).

References

People from County Meath
Legendary High Kings of Ireland
1st-century BC legendary rulers
1st-century BC murdered monarchs
Deaths from fire